James Ben Kaba was a Ghanaian politician and member of the first parliament of the second republic of Ghana representing  Bolgatanga     constituency under the membership of the Progress Party (PP).

Early life and education 
Kaba was born on 25 July 1942 in the Upper East region of Ghana. He attended Mfantsipim College formerly Mfantsipim School. He then moved to Accra to advance his education at University of Ghana where he obtained his Bachelor of Laws  with specialization in Law.  He worked as a Lawyer before going into parliament.

Politics 
Kaba began his political career in 1969 when he became the parliamentary candidate for the Progress Party (PP)  to represent the  Bolgatanga constituency prior to the commencement of the 1969 Ghanaian parliamentary election. He assumed office as a member of the first parliament of the second republic of Ghana on 1 October 1969 after being a pronounced winner at the 1969 Ghanaian parliamentary election.  His tenure ended on 13 January 1972.

Personal life 
Kaba is a Catholic Christian.

References 

1942 births
Ghanaian MPs 1969–1972
People from Upper East Region
Progress Party (Ghana) politicians
University of Ghana alumni
Living people